The 2015 season was Perak's 12th consecutive season in the Malaysian Super League.

Background

On September 16, Croatian coach Vjeran Simunic was named as new head coach, replacing Abu Bakar Fadzim who managed to steer Perak clear of relegation with the help of technical director Karlheinz Weigang, who was himself appointed mid-season.

The official 2015 squad was named on December 4. Some of the notable signings included Malaysian international Bobby Gonzales and former Harimau Muda A goalkeeper Mohd Zamir Selamat. Of the foreign players from the previous season, only Marco Tulio was retained. The remaining foreign player slots were filled by Charles Souza Chad and Thiago Junior Aquino. Namkung Woong was named to fill the Asian foreign player quota despite rumours linking Mohd Shahrazen Said.

On December 31, Simunic was officially replaced by M. Karathu, without having ever taken charge in an official match.

Players

First team squad

Pre-season And Friendlies

Competitions

Super League

League table

Matches

FA Cup

Knockout stage

Quarter-finals

Malaysia Cup

Group stage

Transfers

In

Out

Statistics

Top scorers
The list is sorted by shirt number when total goals are equal.
{| class="wikitable sortable" style="font-size: 95%; text-align: center;"
|-
!width=10|
!width=10|
!width=10|
!width=150|Player
!width=50|Super League
!width=50|FA Cup
!width=50|Malaysia Cup
!width=50|Total
|-
|1
|MF
|19
|align=left| Namkung Woong
|9||4||0||13
|-
|2
|FW
|10
|align=left| Charles Souza Chad
|9||0||3||12
|-
|3
|MF
|16
|align=left| Nurridzuan
|5||0||0||5
|-
|rowspan="2"|4
|MF
|4
|align=left| Nasir Basharudin
|2||1||0||3
|-
|ST
|9
|align=left| Bobby Gonzales
|2||0||1||3
|-
|rowspan="2"|6
|DF
|26
|align=left| Thiago Junio
|2||0||0||2
|-
|MF
|36
|align=left| Horace James
|2||0||0||2
|-
|rowspan="2"|8
|ST
|20
|align=left| Marco Tulio
|0||1||0||1
|-
|MF
|35
|align=left| Khairil Anuar
|0||0||1||1
|-
|#
|colspan="3"|Own goals
|1
|0
|0
|1 
|-class="sortbottom"
|colspan=4|Total
|32
|6
|5
|43

References

Perak F.C. seasons
Perak FA